Leonardo "Léo" Rech Ortiz (born 3 January 1996) is a Brazilian footballer who plays for Red Bull Bragantino as a centre-back.

Club career
Born in Porto Alegre, Ortiz was an Internacional youth graduate. He made his senior debut with the B-team on 2 September 2015, starting in a 2–0 Copa FGF away win against Igrejinha.

After appearing with the B-side, Ortiz was promoted to the main squad in January 2017, and made his first team debut on 25 February by starting in a 1–0 home win against Brasil de Pelotas for the Campeonato Gaúcho championship. On 6 March, he extended his contract until December 2019.

Ortiz contributed with 13 league appearances during his first senior campaign, as his side achieved promotion to the Série A at first attempt. On 31 December 2017, he was loaned to top-tier side Sport Recife for one year.

Ortiz made his debut in the main category of Brazilian football on 15 April 2018, starting in a 3–0 away loss against América Mineiro. He appeared rarely as his side suffered relegation, and joined Red Bull Brasil on loan on 12 December.

In April 2019, Ortiz became a player of, and signed a permanent contract with Red Bull Bragantino, after the merger of Red Bull Brasil and Clube Atlético Bragantino.

International career
In June 2021, he received his first call-up to the Brazil national team, amidst the 2021 Copa América on home soil, to replace injured defender Felipe for the quarter-finals onward. He became the first Bragantino player to be summoned to the national team since 1994, and the first to be called since Red Bull took over the club. Bragantino was leading the Brasileirao at the moment of the summoning. Brazil finished the continental championship as runners-up.

Career statistics

References

External links

1996 births
Living people
Footballers from Porto Alegre
Brazilian footballers
Association football defenders
Campeonato Brasileiro Série A players
Campeonato Brasileiro Série B players
Sport Club Internacional players
Sport Club do Recife players
Red Bull Brasil players
Red Bull Bragantino players
Brazil international footballers
2021 Copa América players